The Pottsville Dipping Vat is a historic cattle processing structure in Rankin Park, on East Ash Street in Pottsville, Arkansas. It consists of a U-shaped concrete structure, with an extended base at one end. It was probably built about 1915, not long after the state began a program to eradicate Texas cattle fever from its livestock.

The vat was listed on the National Register of Historic Places in 2006.

See also
National Register of Historic Places listings in Pope County, Arkansas

References

National Register of Historic Places in Pope County, Arkansas
Buildings and structures completed in 1915
1915 establishments in Arkansas
Plunge dips
Agricultural buildings and structures on the National Register of Historic Places in Arkansas